The 2023 Primera B de Chile, also known as Campeonato Ascenso Betsson 2023 for sponsorship purposes, is the 69th season of the Primera B de Chile, Chile's second-tier football league. The fixture for the season was announced on 11 January 2023, with the competition starting on 10 February and ending in November 2023.

Format
The 16 participating teams will play each other in a double round-robin tournament (once at home and once away) for a total of 30 matches, with the top team at the end of the 30 rounds winning the championship as well as promotion to the Campeonato Nacional for the following season. The play-off tournament to decide the second promoted team (Liguilla) will be expanded from five to seven teams, which will be the ones placing from second to eighth place, and the league runners-up will receive a bye to the semi-finals. The playoffs winning team will the second and last promoted team to the top flight for the following season. The bottom-placed team at the end of the regular season will be relegated to the Segunda División Profesional.

Teams

The tournament is played by 16 teams, 13 returning from the previous season, two relegated from the 2022 Campeonato Nacional (Deportes La Serena and Deportes Antofagasta), and the 2022 Segunda División Profesional champions San Marcos de Arica. These teams replaced Magallanes and Deportes Copiapó, who were promoted to the 2023 Campeonato Nacional, as well as Fernández Vial and Deportes Melipilla, both relegated to Segunda División for this season.

Stadia and locations

Standings

Results

See also
2023 Chilean Primera División
2023 Copa Chile
2023 Supercopa de Chile

References

External links
Primera B on ANFP's website

Primera B de Chile seasons
Primera B
Chile
Chile